This is a list of mine warfare vessels of the United States Navy.

Ship status is indicated as either currently active [A] (including ready reserve), inactive [I], or precommissioning [P]. Ships in the inactive category include only ships in the inactive reserve, ships which have been disposed from US service have no listed status. Ships in the precommissioning category include ships under construction or on order.

Historical overview
Mine warfare consists of: minelaying, the deployment of explosive naval mines at sea to sink enemy ships or to prevent their access to particular areas; minesweeping, the removal or detonation of naval mines; and degaussing, the process of decreasing or eliminating a remnant magnetic field in a ship's hull to prevent its detection by magnetic mines. The US Navy has operated ships and craft for all three purposes. Mine planting is the laying and maintenance of controlled mines for harbor defense, which was traditionally a role of the US Army.

Classifications
Mine warfare ships were originally considered by the US Navy to be either auxiliaries or yard and district craft, and so were given hull classification symbols beginning with either 'A' or 'Y', depending on their capabilities. The exceptions were certain large 'cruiser' minelayers which were given hull symbols beginning with 'CM', and converted destroyers which were given hull symbols beginning with 'DM'. 

On 7 February 1955 all of these ships and craft still in service or reserve were reclassed and received new hull symbols beginning with 'M', usually without change of hull number. The exception was the degaussing ships, which retained the 'A' hull symbol.

Modern Littoral Combat Ships use 'L' hull symbols even though they can be used for mine warfare.

Auxiliary Minelayers (ACM)
All ACMs except USS Buttress and USS Monadnock were originally US Army mine planters.

Chimo-class

 
 
 
 
 
 
 
 , later ARC-5

PCE-842-class
 , ex-PCE-878

Camanche-class

Other

Degaussing Ships (ADG)

 USS Lodestone (ADG-8), ex-YDG-8
 USS Magnet (ADG-9), ex-YDG-9
 USS Deperm (ADG-10), ex-YDG-10
 USS Ampere (ADG-11), ex-YDG-11
 USS Surfbird (ADG-383), ex-MSF-383

Minesweepers (AM)

Lapwing-class
Lapwing-class

 , later AVP-1
 , later AT-137, ATO-137
 , later AT-140, ATO-140
 , wrecked Kanaga Island, Alaska 19 February 1938
 , sunk by Japanese artillery on Bataan 4 May 1942
 , wrecked off Chirikof Island, Alaska 6 June 1923
 , later AT-136, ATO-136
 , wrecked Point Mosquito Panama 15 December 1925
 , sunk in air attack, Corregidor, PI, 10 April 1942
 , later AVP-2
 , canceled 4 December 1918
 , canceled 4 December 1918
 , later AT-143, ATO-143
 , later AT-145, ATO-145
 , scuttled off Corregidor 5 May 1942
 , later AT-138, ATO-138
 , later YNG-20
 , later AVP-3
 , later AVP-4
 , later AT-131, ATO-131
 , later AT-168, ATO-168
 , later ASR-1
 , later AVP-5
 , later ARS-32
 , later AT-135, ATO-135
 , later AT-139, ATO-139
 , later AVP-6
 , later ASR-2
 , later ARS-2
 , later AT-141, ATO-141
 , later AT-142, ATO-142
 , later ARS-1
 , scuttled Guam 8 December 1941
 , later AVP-7
 
 , scuttled in Manila Bay, PI following damage from air attack 10 December 1941
 , accidentally sank while under tow Hawaii 26 June 1937
 , later ARS-3
 , later ASR-3
 , later AT-133, ATO-133
 , later AVP-8
 , canceled 4 December 1918
 ,	later AT-134
 , later ASR-4
 , later ASR-5
 
 , later ASR-6
 , later ARS-4
 , canceled 4 December 1918
 , canceled 4 December 1918
 , later AVP-9
 , later AT-144
 , later ARS-11
 , later ARS-12

Raven-class
Raven-class minesweepers

The Raven class became Minesweepers, Steel Hulled (MSF) on 7 February 1955.
 
 , sunk by mine, English Channel, 5 June 1944, 6 killed

Auk-class
Auk-class minesweepers

The Auk class became Minesweepers, Steel Hulled (MSF) on 7 February 1955.

 
 
 
 
 
 , later AGS-19
 
 
 
 
 
 
 
 
 
 
 , later AGS-20
 , later AGS-17
 , later AGS-18
 
 
 
 
 
 
 
 
 
 
 
 
 
 
 
 , sunk by mine, Normandy, 7 June 1944, at least 1 killed

Bullfinch-class

Catbird-class
 , later IX-183
 , later IX-170

Albatross-class
Albatross-class minesweepers
 , later IX-171
 , later IX-172

Kite-class
Kite-class minesweepers
 
 , later IX-166

Goshawk-class
 , ex-AMc-4, later IX-195

Goldcrest-class

Adroit-class
Adroit-class minesweepers

All ships of this class were converted to submarine chasers (PC)

 , later PC-1586
 , later PC-1587
 , later PC-1588
 , later PC-1589
 , later PC-1590
 , later PC-1591
 , later PC-1592
 , later PC-1593
 , later PC-1594
 , later PC-1595
 , later PC-1596
 , later PC-1597
 , later PC-1598
 , later PC-1599
 , later PC-1600
 , later PC-1601
 , later PC-1602
 , later PC-1603

Hawk-class
Hawk-class minesweepers

Admirable-class

The Admirable class became Minesweepers, Steel Hulled (MSF) on 7 February 1955.

 
 
 
 
 
 
 
 
 
 
 
 
 
 
 
 
 
 
 
 
 
 
 
 
 
 
 
 
 
 
 AM-166 through AM-208 – canceled 9 April 1942
 AM-209 through AM-213 – canceled 10 April 1942
 
 
 
 
 
 
 
 
 
 
 
 
 
  – canceled June 6, 1944
  – canceled June 6, 1944
  – canceled June 6, 1944
  – canceled June 6, 1944
  – canceled June 6, 1944
 
 
 
 
  – canceled June 6, 1944
  – canceled June 6, 1944
 
 
 , museum ship
 
 
  – canceled June 6, 1944
  – canceled June 6, 1944
  – canceled June 6, 1944
 
 
 
 
 
 
 
 
 
 
 
 
 
 
 
 
 
 
 
 
 
 
 
 
 
 
 
 
 
 , sunk by mine off Wonsan, Korea, 12 October 1950, 13 missing or killed
 
 , sunk by mine off Wonsan, Korea, 10 October 1950
 
 
 
 
 
 
 
 
 
 
 
 
  – canceled December 1, 1944
  – canceled November 1, 1945
  – canceled June 6, 1944
  – canceled June 6, 1944
 
 
 
 
 
 
 
 
 
 
 
 
 
 
 
 
 
 
 
 
  – canceled November 1, 1945
 
  – canceled November 1, 1945
 
 
 
 
 
 
  – canceled June 6, 1944
  – canceled June 6, 1944
  – canceled June 6, 1944
  – canceled June 6, 1944
  – canceled November 1, 1945
  – canceled November 1, 1945
  – canceled November 1, 1945
  – canceled November 1, 1945
  – canceled November 1, 1945
  – canceled August 11, 1945
  – canceled August 11, 1945
  – canceled August 11, 1945
  – canceled August 11, 1945
  – canceled August 11, 1945
  – canceled August 11, 1945
  – canceled August 11, 1945
  – canceled August 11, 1945
  – canceled August 11, 1945
  – canceled August 11, 1945
  – canceled August 11, 1945
  – canceled August 11, 1945
  – canceled August 11, 1945
  – canceled August 11, 1945
  – canceled August 11, 1945
  – canceled August 11, 1945
  – canceled August 11, 1945
  – canceled August 11, 1945
  – canceled August 11, 1945
  – canceled August 11, 1945
  – canceled August 11, 1945
  – canceled August 11, 1945
  – canceled August 11, 1945
  – canceled August 11, 1945
  – canceled August 11, 1945

Algerine-class (built for the United Kingdom)
These minesweepers were built for the U.K. and redesignated from an AM hull number to a J hull number. Most were returned to the US at the end of Lend-Lease.

Agile- or Aggressive-class
These classes have considerable overlap; some ships are considered both Agile- and Agreessive-class. A few more are occasionally considered Dash-class. These classes became Minesweepers, Ocean (MSO) on 7 February 1955.

Agile-class minesweepers

 
 
 
 
 
 
 
 
 
 
 
 
 
 
 
 
 
 
 
 
 
 
 
 
 
 
 
 
 
 AM-450 – to France as  
 AM-451 – to France as  then to Uruguay as  
 AM-452 – to France as  
 AM-453 – to France as 
 AM-454 – to France as 
 
 
 
 
 
 
 
 
 
 
 
 
 
 
 
 
 
 
 
 
 AM-475 – to France as 
 AM-476 – to France as 
 AM-477 – to France as 
 AM-478 – to Portugal as 
 AM-479– to Portugal as 
 AM-480 – to the Netherlands as  
 AM-481 – to the Netherlands as 
 AM-482 – to the Netherlands as 
 AM-483 – to the Netherlands as 
 AM-484 – to the Netherlands as 
 AM-485 – to the Netherlands as 
 AM-486 – to Portugal as 
 AM-487 – to Portugal as 
 
 
 
 
 
 
 
 
 
 AM-500 – to France as 
 AM-501 – to France as 
 AM-502 – to France as 
 AM-503 – to Belgium as 
 AM-504 – to Belgium as 
 AM-505 – to France as 
 AM-506 – to Italy as 
 AM-507 – to Italy as 
 AM-512 – to France as 
 AM-513 – to France as 
 AM-514 – to France as 
 AM-515 – to Belgium as 
 AM-516 – to Belgium as 
 AM-517 – to Italy as 
 AM-518 – to Italy as

Accentor- or Acme-class
The Acme class became Minesweepers, Ocean (MSO) on 7 February 1955.

Ability-class
The Ability class became Minesweepers, Ocean (MSO) on 7 February 1955.

Other/unknown class

 , later IX-165
 
 
 
 , later Agate (PYc-4)
 , later Captor (PYc-40)
  – built for U.K. December 22, 1943
  AM-342 through AM-350 – hull numbers not used
  – canceled November 1, 1945
  – canceled November 1, 1945
  – canceled November 1, 1945
  – canceled November 1, 1945
  – canceled November 1, 1945

Auxiliary Base Minesweepers (AMb)
 USS Raymonde (AMb-17), later YP-375, IX-199

Coastal Minesweepers (AMc)

Pipit-class

Goshawk-class
 , later AM-79

Chatterer-class

Grosbeak-class

Crow-class
 , sunk during torpedo training session, Puget Sound, 23 August 1943

Egret-class
 , later IX-181

Frigate Bird-class

Reedbird-class

Firecrest-class

Accentor-class
Accentor-class minesweepers

 
 
 
 
 
 
 
 
 
 
 
 
 
 
 
 
 
 
 , later IX-230
 
 
 
 
 
 
 
 
 
 
 
 
 
 
 
 
 
 
 
 
 
 
 
 
 
 
 , wrecked by Typhoon Louise Okinawa October 1945
 , later IX-202
 
 
 
 
 
 
 
 
 
 
 
 
 
 
 
 
 
 , later IX-231
 , later IX-232

Agile-class
 , later IX-203

Acme-class

Admirable-class

PCS-1376-class
The PCS-1376-class of coastal minesweepers were originally Patrol Craft Sweepers (PCS) which lacked minesweeping gear. They were built on 134-foot  hulls and then converted back into minesweepers.
 , ex-PCS-1466
 , ex-PCS-1465, later AMCU-14

Other/unknown classes
Many coastal minesweepers were civilian ships purchased by the US Navy and then converted for use as minesweeper ships. Among them are various designs and makes of yachts, fishing vessels, and other ships.

 , later IX-175
 
 
 
 
 
 
 
 
 
 
 
 
 , later IX-194
 , later IX-180
 
 
 
 
 
 , later YN-53
 
 
 
 , later IX-176
 
 
 
 
 
 
 
 
 
 
 , ex-YP-150, later IX-177
 
 
 
 
 
 
 
 
 
 
 
 
 
 
 
 
 
 
 
 
 
 
 
 
 
 
 
 
 
 
 
 
 
 
 
 
 
 
 
 
 
 
 
 
 
 
 
 
 
 
 
 
 AMc-202, later YP-389

Coastal Minesweepers (Underwater Locator) (AMCU)
On 7 February 1955, all AMCU's were redesignated as Coastal Minehunters (MHC). Hull numbers were not changed.

AMCU-7-class
All AMCU-7 class minesweepers were conversions of Landing Craft Infantry.

 , ex-LCI-589
 , ex-LCI-400
 , ex-LCI-409
 , ex-LCI-513
 , ex-LCI-514
 , ex-LCI-652, conversion canceled
 , ex-LCI-653
 USS Blue Jay (AMCU-17), ex-LCI-654, not commissioned
 USS Chaffinch (AMCU-18), ex-LCI-694, not commissioned
 USS Chewink (AMCU-19), ex-LCI-701, not commissioned
 USS Chimango (AMCU-20), ex-LCI-703, not commissioned
 , ex-LCI-709
 USS Cotinga (AMCU-22), ex-LCI-776, not commissioned
 USS Dunlin (AMCU-23), ex-LCI-777, conversion canceled
 , ex-LCI-869
 , ex-LCI-870
 , ex-LCI-874
 USS Killdeer (AMCU-27), ex-LCI-883, conversion canceled
 , ex-LCI-884
 USS Magpie (AMCU-29), ex-LCI-944, not commissioned
 , ex-LCI-963, not commissioned
 USS Medrick (AMCU-31), ex-LCI-966, conversion canceled
 USS Minivet (AMCU-32), ex-LCI-969, conversion canceled
 , ex-LCI-973
 , ex-LCI-976
 , ex-LCI-982
 , ex-LCI-1001, conversion canceled
 , ex-LCI-1022
 , ex-LCI-1008
 , ex-LCI-1052, not commissioned
 USS Shearwater (AMCU-40), ex-LCI-882, conversion canceled
 , ex-LCI-1093
 , ex-LCI-1098

YMS-1-class

 , ex-YMS-242, AGS-12, AGSC-12
 , ex-YMS-262, AGS-13, AGSC-13
 , ex-YMS-324, AMS-16
 , ex-YMS-417, AMS-26
 , ex-YMS-443, AMS-34
 , ex-PCS-1393, YMS-446, AMS-35
 , ex-PCS-1456, YMS-479, AMS-39

PCS-1376-class
 , ex-PCS-1465, AMc-204

Other/unknown classes

Ocean Minesweepers (AMS)

YMS-1-class
 , ex-YMS-80, later EMSC(O)-1
 , ex-YMS-164, later MHC-44
 , ex-YMS-170, later MHC-45
 , ex-YMS-179, later MSC(O)-4
 , ex-YMS-192, later MSC(O)-5
 , ex-YMS-201, later MSC(O)-6
 , ex-YMS-215
 , ex-YMS-218, later MSC(O)-8
 , ex-YMS-219, later MSC(O)-9
 , ex-YMS-231, later MSC(O)-10
 , ex-YMS-238, later MSC(O)-11
 , ex-YMS-306, later MSO(O)-12
 , ex-YMS-312, later MSC(O)-13
 , ex-YMS-317
 , ex-YMS-321, later MSC(O)-15
 , ex-YMS-324, later AMCU-46
 , ex-YMS-362, later MSC(O)-17
 , ex-YMS-369, later MSC(O)-18
 , ex-YMS-371, later MSC(O)-19
 , ex-YMS-372, later MSC(O)-20
 , ex-YMS-373
 , ex-YMS-374, later MSC(O)-22
 , ex-YMS-376, later MSC(O)-23
 , ex-YMS-395, later MSC(O)-24
 , ex-YMS-400, sunk by mine off Chusan Po, Korea, 1 Oct 1950, 21 killed
 , ex-YMS-417, later AMCU-47
 , ex-YMS-419, later MSC(O)-27
 , ex-YMS-422, later MSC(O)-28
 , ex-YMS-430, later MSC(O)-29
 , ex-YMS–434, grounded 30 Mar 1949
 , ex-YMS-437, sunk by mine in Wonsan harbor, Korea, 2 Feb 1951, 8 killed
 , ex-YMS-441, later MSC(O)-32
 , ex-YMS-442, later MSC(O)-33
 , ex-YMS-443, later AMCU-48
 , ex-YMS-446, later AMCU-49
 , ex-YMS-461, later MSC(O)-36
 , ex-YMS-470, later MSC(O)-37
 , ex-YMS-471, later MSC(O)-38
 , ex-YMS-479, later AMCU-50
 , ex-YMS-415, later MSC(O)-40
 , ex-YMS-45, later MSC(O)-41
 , ex-YMS-109, later MSC(O)-42
 , ex-YMS-113, later MSC(O)-43
 , ex-YMS-114, later MSC(O)-44
 , ex-YMS-120, later MSC(O)-45
 , ex-YMS-136, later MSC(O)-46
 , ex-YMS-193, later MSC(O)-47
 , ex-YMS-268, later MSC(O)-48
 , ex-YMS-271, later MSC(O)-49
 , ex-YMS-290, later MSC(O)-50
 , ex-YMS-291, later MSC(O)-51
 , ex-YMS-299, later MSC(O)-52
 , ex-YMS-311, later MSC(O)-53
 , ex-YMS-327, later MSC(O)-54
 , ex-YMS-402, later MCS(O)-55
 , ex-YMS-444, later MSC(O)-56
 , ex-YMS-294, later MSC(O)-57
 , ex-YMS-425, later MSC(O)-58

Adjutant- or Bluebird-class
This class became Minesweepers, Coastal (MSC) on 7 February 1955.

  (transferred to Portugal)
  (transferred to France)
  (transferred to France)
  (transferred to Italy)
  (transferred to Belgium)

Albatross-class
The Albatross class became Minesweepers, Coastal (MSC) on 7 February 1955.

Other/unknown classes

British Minesweepers (BAM)
For more vessels of this class see Catherine class minesweeper

Minelayers (CM)

 , ex-C-3
 , ex-C-5, later Tahoe, Yosemite

Aroostook-class
 , ex-ID-1256, later AK-44
 , ex-ID-1255, later ARG-1

Catskill-class
 , later MM-5, MMF-5
 , later LSV-1, MCS-1
 , later LSV-2, MCS-2

Other/unknown classes and unique ships

 , ex-AN-5, later AKN-4
 
 , ex-CMc-5, sunk by mine off Le Harve, France on 25 September 1944, 58 killed
 
 , wrecked by Typhoon Louise Okinawa October 1945

Coastal Minelayers (CMc)

 , later PY-13
 , later PG-52
 
 
 , later CM-10
 , later AN-5, CM-8

Light Minelayers (DM)

Wickes-class
These ships were originally designated as Wickes-class destroyers and later reclassified to light minelayers around 1920.

Clemson-class
These ships were originally designated Clemson-class destroyers and later reclassified as light minelayers in 1937.

Robert H. Smith-class
These ships were originally designated Allen M. Sumner-class destroyers but were converted to Robert H. Smith-class destroyer minelayers in 1944. In 1955 they would be reclassified as Fast Minelayers (MMD).

High Speed/Destroyer Minesweepers (DMS)

Wickes-class

 , wrecked by Typhoon Louise Okinawa October 1945

Clemson-class

 
 , wrecked by Typhoon Louise Okinawa October 1945

Gleaves-class 

 
 
 
 
 
 
 
 , sunk in collision 26 April 1952, 176 killed
 
 
 
 
 
 
 
 
 
 
 
 
 
 
 
 
  – not converted to DMS

Converted steamships and freighters (ID)

Eight steamships and freighters were used for laying the North Sea Mine Barrage during World War I.

 , later CM-3, AK-44
 , later CM-4, ARG-1

Mine Countermeasures Ships (MCM)

Avenger-class

  [I]
  [I]
  [A]
 
 , wrecked 17 January 2013 Tubbataha Reef Philippines
  [A]
  [A]
 
  [A]
  [A]
  [A]
 
  [A]
  [A]

Mine Countermeasures Support Ships (MCS)
Many Mine Countermeasures Support (MCS) ships were previous vehicle landing, tank landing, dock landing, or amphibious assault ships that were reclassified to the MCS type in later years.

Catskill-class
 , ex-LSV-1
 , ex-LSV-2

Osage-class
 , ex-LSV-3, MCS conversion canceled
 , ex-LSV-4, MCS conversion canceled
 , ex-LSV-5, MCS conversion canceled

LST-542-class
 , ex-LST-1069

Ashland-class
 , ex-LSD-4

Iwo Jima-class
 , ex-LPH-12

Coastal Minehunters (MHC)
On 7 February 1955, all Coastal Minesweepers (Underwater Locator) (AMCU)s were redesignated as MHCs. Hull numbers were not changed. Bobolink, Bunting, and the Osprey class never had AMCU designations.

LCI(L)-351-class
aka AMCU-7 class

YMS-1-class

PCS-1376-class

Other/unknown classes

Osprey-class
Osprey-class

Coastal Minelayers (MMC)

Auk-class

 , ex-MSF-117
 , ex-MSF-119
 , ex-MSF-323
 
 , ex-MSF-112

LSM-1 class
At least 9 Landing Ship Mediums were converted into coastal minelayers for transfer to NATO allies.

 , ex-LSM-301
 , ex-LSM-303
 , ex-LSM-390
 , ex-LSM-392
 , ex-LSM-481
 , ex-LSM-484
 , ex-LSM-490
 , ex-LSM-492
 , ex-LSM-493

unknown class

Fast Minelayers (MMD)

Fast Minelayers (MMD) were originally classed as Light Minelayers (DM), but were redesignated in 1955. Hull numbers were not changed.

Robert H. Smith-class

Fleet Minelayers (MMF)

Catskill-class

 , ex-CM-5, ex-MM-5

Minesweepers, Coastal (MSC)
All Albatross and Bluebird class MSC vessels were originally classed as AMS Ocean Minesweepers prior to 7 February 1955. Hull numbers were not changed.

Bluebird-class

MSC-218-class

Albatross-class

Unknown/other class

Minesweepers, Coastal (Old) (MSC(O))
All Ocean Minesweepers (AMS) which were originally YMS-1-class minesweepers and still on hand on 7 February 1955 were redesignated as Minesweepers, Coastal (Old) (MSC(O)). Hull numbers were not changed.

YMS-1-class

 
 
 
 
 
 
 
 
 
 
 
 
 , grounded 12 September 1963, CTL

Minesweepers, Steel Hulled (MSF)
All MSF vessels were originally classed as AM minesweepers prior to 7 February 1955. Hull numbers were not changed.

Raven-class

Auk-class

 
 
 
 
 
 
 
 
 
 
 
 
 
 
 , later MMC-5
 
 
 , later MMC-1
 
 , later MMC-2
 
 
 
 
 
 
 
 
 
 
 
 
 
 
 , later MMC-3
 
 
 
 
 , later AG-176

Admirable-class

 
 
 
 
 
 
 
 
 
 
 
 
 
 
 
 
 
 
 
 
 
 
 
 
 
 
 
 
 
 
 
 
 
 
 
 
 
 
 
 
 
 
 
 
 
 
 
 
 
 
 
 
 
 
 
 
 
 
 
 
 , later IX-305
 
 
 
 
 
 , later to US Army intelligence as USAS Report (AGP-289)

Inshore Minesweepers (MSI)

Minesweepers, Ocean (MSO)
All MSO vessels were originally classed as AM minesweepers prior to 7 February 1955. Hull numbers were not changed.

Agile- or Aggressive-class
Ships of this class are variously called Agile- or Aggressive-class depending on source. Some four ships are also sometimes named as a part of a distinct Dash-subclass.

 
 
 
 
 
 
 
 
 
 
 
 
 
 
 
 
 
 
 
 
 
 
 
 
 , lost by fire off Guam, 24 April 1973, no deaths
 
 
 
 
 MSO-450 (built for France as the Berneval (M 613))
 MSO-451 (built for France as the Bir Hakeim (M 614))
 MSO-452 (built for France as the Garigliano (M 617))
 MSO-453 (built for France as the Alençon (M 612))
 MSO-454 (built for France as the Dompaire (M 616))
 
 
 
 
 
 
 
 
 
 
 
 
 
 
 
 
 
 
 
 
 MSO-475 (built for France as the My Tho (M 618))
 MSO-476 (built for France as the Can Tho (M 615))
 MSO-477 (built for France as the Vinh Long (M 619))
 MSO-478 (built for Portugal as the São Jorge (M 415))
 MSO-479 (built for Portugal as the Pico (M 416))
 MSO-480 (built for the Netherlands as the Onversaagd (M 884))
 MSO-481 (built for the Netherlands as the Onbevreesd (M 885))
 MSO-482 (built for the Netherlands as the Onvervaard (M 888))
 MSO-483 (built for the Netherlands as the Onverschrokken (M 886))
 MSO-484 (built for the Netherlands as the Onvermoeid (M 887))
 MSO-485 (built for the Netherlands as the Onverdroten (M 889))
 MSO-486 (built for Portugal as the Graciosa (M 417))
 MSO-487 (built for Portugal as the Corvo (M 418))
 
 
 
 
 
 , burned, capsized and sank 25 June 1966, San Juan PR, no deaths, CTL
 
 
 
 MSO-497 (cancelled)
 MSO-498 (built for Norway as the Lågen (M 950))
 MSO-499 (built for Norway as the Namsen (M 951))
 MSO-500 (built for France as the Berlaimont (M 620))
 MSO-501 (built for France as the Origny (M 621))
 MSO-502 (built for France as the Autun (M 622))
 MSO-503 (built for Belgium as the Artevelde (M 907))
 MSO-504 (built for Belgium as the Artevelde (M 906))
 MSO-505 (built for France as the Baccarat (M 623))
 MSO-506 (built for Italy as the Storione (M 5431))
 MSO-507 (built for Italy as the Salmone (M 5430))
 MSO-512 (built for France as the Narvik (M 609))
 MSO-513 (built for France as the Ouistreham (M 610))
 MSO-514 (built for France as the Colmar (M 610))
 MSO-515 (built for Belgium as the Georges Truffaut (M 908))
 MSO-516 (built for Belgium as the F. Bovesse (M 909))
 MSO-517 (built for Italy as the Sgombro (M 5432))
 MSO-518 (built for Italy as the Squalo (M 5433))

Acme-class

Ability-class

 
 , later AG-520
 , later AG-521
 MSO-522 (built for Belgium as the Van Haverbeke (M 902))
 MSO-523 to MSO-538 were planned but never built.

Minesweepers (Special Device) (MSS)
Note that the official classification of these as devices rather than ships accounts for these ships absence of listings among the Navy's ships while designated MSS-1 and MSS-2. 

 MSS-1 (formerly, the Harry L. Glucksman)

Submarine Minelayers (SM)

 USS Argonaut (SM-1), later APS-1, sunk by Japanese destroyers off Rabaul on 10 January 1943

Degaussing Craft (YDG)

YDG-1
YDG-2
YDG-3
YDG-4, lost off New Caledonia, 1 October 1943
YDG-5
YDG-6, ex-YMS-344
YDG-7, ex-YMS-480
YDG-8, ex-PCE-876, later ADG-8
YDG-9, ex-PCE-879, later ADG-9
YDG-10, ex-PCE-883, later ADG-10
YDG-11, ex-PCE-919, AM-359, later ADG-11

Motor Mineplanters (YMP)

Mineplanters were used to plant and maintain controlled mines for harbor defense; since the US Army had the primary responsibility for these minefields it is likely that the YMP hull designation was seldom used.

Auxiliary Motor Mine Sweepers (YMS)
All Auxiliary Motor Mine Sweeper (YMS) ships to date are YMS-1-class, which itself has multiple subclasses.

YMS-1-subclass

 
 
 
 
 
 
 
 
 
 
 
 
 
 , sunk in collision, Boston Harbor, 11 Jan 1945
 
 
 
 
 , sunk by mine, Angaur, Palau Islands, 24 September 1944
 
 , sunk by mine, Toulon, France, 1 September 1944
 
 
 , sunk by mine, St. Tropez, France, 16 August 1944
 
 
 
 
 
 , sunk by mine, Anzio, Italy, 25 January 1944
 
 
 
 
 
 
 
 
 , sunk by mine, Balikpapan, Borneo, 26 June 1945
 
 
 
 
 
 , later AMS-41
 
 
 , sunk by Japanese artillery on Corregidor 14 February 1945
 
 , sunk by mine, Balikpapan, Borneo, 18 June 1945
 
 
 
 
 
 
 
 
 
 
 
 
 
 
 
 
 
 
 
 , lost in storm off Leyte, Philippines, 17 October 1944
 , sunk by a mine off Borneo, 3 April 1945
 
 
 
 
 
 
 
 
 , later AMS-1
 
 
 
 , sunk by mine, Balikpapan, Borneo, 9 July 1945
 
 
 
 
 
 
 
 
 
 
 
 
 
 , lost in Typhoon Ida 16 September 1945
 
 
 
 
 , damaged by mine Okinawa, 8 April 1945, CTL, 5 killed
 
 
 
 
 
 , later AMS-42
 
 
 
 , later AMS-43
 , later AMS-44
 
 
 
 
 
 , later AMS-45
 
 
 
 
 
 
 
 
 
 
 
 
 , foundered 20 February 1943 off Coos Bay, OR

YMS-135-subclass

 
 , later AMS-46
  (transferred to UK)
 
 
 
  (transferred to UK)
  (transferred to UK)
 
 
 
 , lost in Typhoon Louise, Okinawa, 9 October 1945
 
  (transferred to UK)
  (transferred to UK)
  (transferred to UK)
 
  (transferred to UK)
  (transferred to UK)
  (transferred to UK)
  (transferred to UK)
  (transferred to UK)
  (transferred to UK)
 
 
 
  (transferred to UK)
  (transferred to UK)
 
 , later AMS-2
 
 
  (transferred to UK)
  (transferred to UK)
 
 , later AMS-3
  (transferred to UK)
  (transferred to UK)
  (transferred to UK)
  (transferred to UK)
  (transferred to UK)
 
 
 
 , later AMS-4
 
  (transferred to UK)
  (transferred to UK)
 
 
  (transferred to UK)
  (transferred to UK)
  (transferred to UK)
  (transferred to UK)
  (transferred to UK)
  (transferred to UK)
  (transferred to UK)
 , later AMS-5
 , later AMS-47
  (transferred to UK)
 
 
 
 
 
 
 , later AMS-6
  (transferred to UK)
  (transferred to UK)
  (transferred to UK)
  (transferred to UK)
  (transferred to UK)
 
 
  (transferred to UK)
  (transferred to UK)
  (transferred to UK)
  (transferred to UK)
  (transferred to UK)
  (transferred to UK)
 , later AMS-7
 
  (transferred to UK)
 , later AMS-8
 , later AMS-9
 
  (transferred to UK)
 
  (transferred to UK)
 
  (transferred to UK)
 
 
 
  (transferred to UK)
  (transferred to UK)
 , later AMS-10
  (transferred to UK)
  (transferred to UK)
  (transferred to UK)
 
  (transferred to UK)
 
 , later AMS-11
 
  (transferred to UK)
 
 , later AGS-12, AGSC-12, AMCU-12
 
  (transferred to UK)
 
  (transferred to UK)
 
 
 
 
 
  (transferred to UK)
  (transferred to UK)
  (transferred to UK)
  (transferred to UK)
  (transferred to UK)
  (transferred to UK)
  (transferred to UK)
 
 
  (transferred to UK)
 , later AGS-13, AGSC-13, AMCU-13
 , later AGS-14, AGSC-14
 
 
 
 
 , later AMS-48
 
 
 , later AMS-49
 
 
 
 , lost in Typhoon Louise, Okinawa, 9 October 1945
 
  (transferred to UK)
  (transferred to UK)
  (transferred to UK)
  (transferred to UK)
 
  (transferred to UK)
 
  (transferred to UK)
 
 
 
 
 
 , later AMS-50
 , later AMS-51
 
 
 , later AMS-57
 
 
 
 
 , later AMS-52
 
 
 
 
 , sunk by mine Normandy, 30 July 1944, 8 killed
 
 , later AMS-12
 
 
 
 
 , later AMS-53
 , later AMS-13
 
 
 
 
 , later AMS-14
 
 
 
 , later AMS-15
 
 
 , later AMS-16, AMCU-46
 
 
 , later AMS-54
 
 
 
 
 
 
 
 
 
 
 
 
 
 , lost in Typhoon Ida, 16 September 1945
 
 
 , later YDG-6
 
 
 
 
 
 , sunk by mine, Normandy, 2 July 1944
 
 
 
 
 
 
 
 
 
 
 
 , later AMS-17
 
 
 , sunk by mine Balikpapan, Borneo, 26 June 1945, no deaths
 
 
 
 , later AMS-18
 
 , later AMS-19
 , later AMS-20
 , later AMS-21
 , later AMS-22
 
 , later AMS-23
 
 , damaged by mine, Normandy, 30 July 1944, CTL
 
 
 
 
 , lost in Typhoon Louise, Okinawa, 9 October 1945
 
 , sunk by mine, Ulithi, 1 October 1944
 
 
 
 
 
 
 
 
 
 , later AMS-24
 
 
 
 
 , later AMS-25
 
 , later AMS-55
 
 
 
 
 
 
 , lost 12 Sep 1944 in the 1944 Great Atlantic Hurricane, all 33 crew died
 
 
 
 
 
 , later AMS-40
 
 , later AMS-26, AMCU-47
 
 , later AMS-27
 
 , lost in Typhoon Ida, 15 September 1945
 , later AMS-28
 
 , grounded by Typhoon Louise, Okinawa, 9 October 1945, CTL
 , later AMS-58
 
 
 
 
 , later AMS-29
 
 
 
 , later AMS-30
 
 
 , later AMS-31
 
 
 
 , later AMS-32
 , later AMS-33
 , later AMS-34, AMCU-48
 , later AMS-56
 
 , later YDG-7
 , sunk by shore batteries off Tarakan, Borneo, 2 May 1945
 YMS-482 through YMS-500 were planned but cancelled.

YMS-446-subclass

 , ex-PCS-1393, later AMS-35, AMCU-49
 , ex-PCS-1394
 , ex-PCS-1395
 , ex-PCS-1398
 , ex-PCS-1399
 , ex-PCS-1400
 , ex-PCS-1401
 , ex-PCS-1406
 , ex-PCS-1407, grounded by Typhoon Louise, Okinawa, 9 October 1945, CTL
 , ex-PCS-1408
 , ex-PCS-1409
 , ex-PCS-1410
 , ex-PCS-1411
 , ex-PCS-1412
 , ex-PCS-1415
 , ex-PCS-1416, later AMS-36
 , ex-PC-1427, PCS-1427
 , ex-PCS-1428
 , ex-PCS-1432
 , ex-PCS-1433
 , ex-PCS-1434
 , ex-PCS-1435
 , ex-PCS-1436
 , ex-PCS-1437
 , ex-PCS-1438, later AMS-37
 , ex-PCS-1439, later AMS-38
 , ex-PCS-1440, lost in Typhoon Ida, 16 September 1945
 , ex-PCS-1443
 , ex-PCS-1444
 , ex-PCS-1447
 , ex-PCS-1448
 , ex-PCS-1453
 , ex-PCS-1454, broached and capsized by Typhoon Ida, 16 September 1945 at Wakanoura Wan, Japan, CTL
 , ex-PCS-1456, later AMS-39, AMCU-50

Littoral Combat Ships (LCS)

The Littoral Combat Ships can carry Mine Warfare Modules which operate unmanned vehicles of various types for mine clearance operations.

Freedom-class

  [I]
  [A]
  [A]
  [A]
  [A]
  [A]
  [A]
  [A]
  [A]
  [A]
  [A]
  [P]
  [P]
  [P]
  [P]
  [P]

Independence-class
  

  [I]
  [I]
  [A]
  [A]
  [A]
  [A]
  [A]
  [A]
  [A]
  [A]
  [A]
  [A]
  [A]
  [A]
  [P]
  [P]
  [P]
  [P]
  [P]

See also
 Commander Mine Squadron SEVEN
 List of current ships of the United States Navy

References

Citations

Sources

External links 
Museum ships
 USS Hazard (AM-240) - Freedom Park, Omaha, NE
 USS Lucid (AM-458) - Stockton Maritime Museum, Stockton, CA
 MSO-483 - Stichting Maritiem Erfgoed Vlissingen, Netherlands

  
Mine Warfare vessels
USN